The following highways are numbered 26A:

United States
 Florida State Road 26A
 County Road 26A (Alachua County, Florida)
 Maine State Route 26A
Maryland Route 26A
 Nebraska Spur 26A
 New Jersey Route 26A (former)
 New York State Route 26A (former)
 County Route 26A (Columbia County, New York)
 County Route 26A (Greene County, New York)
 County Route 26A (Ulster County, New York)
Utah State Route 26A (former)